Byåsen Church (historically Hallset Church) is a parish church of the Church of Norway in Trondheim municipality in Trøndelag county, Norway. It is located in the Byåsen neighborhood in the city of Trondheim. It is the church for the Byåsen parish which is part of the Heimdal og Byåsen prosti (deanery) in the Diocese of Nidaros. The modern, concrete church was built in a hexagonal design in 1974 using plans drawn up by the architects Johan Arnstad and Ottar Heggenhougen. The church seats about 525 people.

History
The church was built in 1974 and it was consecrated on 1 December 1974 by the bishop Tord Godal. The church was originally called Hallset Church, but the name was changed to better reflect the area that it served. The church building was extensively remodeled in 2004 by the Eggen Architects. The church building also houses parish offices and a day care centre. There is no cemetery on site. The nearest cemetery is at Havstein Church.

See also
List of churches in Nidaros

References

Churches in Trondheim
Churches in Trøndelag
Hexagonal churches in Norway
Concrete churches in Norway
20th-century Church of Norway church buildings
Churches completed in 1974
1974 establishments in Norway